Panguitch Municipal Airport  is a public use airport located three nautical miles (6 km) northeast of the central business district of Panguitch, a city in Garfield County, Utah, United States. It is owned by the Panguitch City Corp. This airport is included in the National Plan of Integrated Airport Systems for 2011–2015, which categorized it as a general aviation facility.

Facilities and aircraft 
Panguitch Municipal Airport covers an area of 351 acres (142 ha) at an elevation of 6,763 feet (2,061 m) above mean sea level. It has one runway designated 18/36 with an asphalt surface measuring 5,700 by 75 feet (1,737 x 23 m).

For the 12-month period ending December 31, 2010, the airport had 2,258 aircraft operations, an average of 188 per month: 98% general aviation and 2% air taxi. At that time there were 3 aircraft based at this airport: 67% single-engine and 33% ultralight.

See also 
 List of airports in Utah

References

External links 
 Aerial image as of October 1998 from USGS The National Map
 
 

Airports in Utah
Transportation in Garfield County, Utah
Buildings and structures in Panguitch, Utah